Eduardo is the Spanish and Portuguese form of the male given name Edward. Another version is Duarte. It may refer to:

Association football
 Carlos Eduardo Bendini Giusti (born 1993), Brazilian centre back, known as Eduardo or Dudu
 Carlos Eduardo Santos Oliveira (born 1986), Brazilian right back, known as Eduardo
 Eduardo Adelino da Silva (born 1979), Brazilian footballer, known as Eduardo
 Eduardo Antunes Coimbra (born 1947), Brazilian attacking midfielder and manager, known as Edu
 Eduardo Bonvallet (1955–2015), Chilean defensive midfielder and sports commentator
 Eduardo Carvalho (born 1982), Portuguese goalkeeper, known as Eduardo
 Eduardo Costa, (born 1982), Brazilian defensive midfielder and coach
 Eduardo Ferreira Abdo Pacheco (born 1987), Brazilian striker
 Eduardo Gonçalves de Oliveira (born 1981), Brazilian striker, known as Edu
 Eduardo Gómez (footballer) (born 1958), Chilean defender
 Eduardo Jacinto de Biasi (born 1997), Brazilian defensive midfielder, known as Eduardo
 Eduardo Jesus (born 2002) Brazilian footballer, known as Eduardo
 Eduardo José Diniz Costa (born 1989), Brazilian full back, known as Eduardo
 Eduardo José da Rosa Milhomem (born 1995), Brazilian defender, known as Eduardo or Dudu
 Eduardo Martini (born 1979), Brazilian goalkeeper
 Eduardo Pereira Rodrigues (born 1992), Brazilian footballer, known as Dudu
 Eduardo Ribeiro dos Santos (born 1980), Brazilian striker
 Eduardo da Conceição Maciel (born 1986), Brazilian forward, known as Eduardo
 Eduardo da Silva (born 1983), Brazilian-born Croatian forward, known as Eduardo or Dudu

Music
 Eduardo (rapper), Carlos Eduardo Taddeo, Brazilian rapper
 Eduardo De Crescenzo, Italian singer, songwriter and multi-instrumentalist

Politicians
 Eduardo Año, Filipino politician and retired army general
 Eduardo Carriles, Spanish lawyer, businessman and politician 
 Eduardo Castro Luque, assassinated Mexican politician
 Eduardo Ferro Rodrigues, Portuguese politician
 Eduardo Maruri, Ecuadorian businessman and politician
 Eduardo Panlilio, Filipino politician and former priest, elected governor of Pampanga
 Eduardo Pérez Bulnes, Argentine politician, one of the signatories of the Declaration of Independence
 Eduardo Rubiño, Spanish politician
 Eduardo Torralba Beci (1881–1929), Spanish journalist and politician

Sportsmen
 Eduardo Barragan, Colombian boxer
 Eduardo Castro, Mexican long-distance runner
 Eduardo Guerrero, Colombian road cyclist
 Eduardo Jhons, Cuban fencer
 Eduardo Martínez, Argentine beach volleyball player 
 Eduardo Mello Borges, futsal player
 Eduardo Piccinini, Brazilian butterfly swimmer
 Eduardo Risso, Uruguayan rower

Others
 Eduardo R. Caianiello, Italian physicist
 Eduardo De Filippo, Italian actor, playwright, screenwriter, author and poet
 Eduardo Eurnekian, Argentine-Armenian billionaire businessman
 Eduardo Galeano, Uruguayan journalist and writer
 Eduardo Galvão (1962–2020), Brazilian actor
 Eduardo Gómez, Spanish actor
 Eduardo Kac, American contemporary artist
 Eduardo Kobra, Brazilian graffiti artist
 Eduardo Lourenço, Portuguese writer, literary scholar and philosopher
 Eduardo Mendoza Garriga, Spanish novelist
 Eduardo Morales Miranda, Chilean physician and founder of Universidad Austral de Chile
 Eduardo Nicol, Spanish-Mexican philosopher
 Eduardo Prado Coelho, Portuguese writer
 Eduardo Saverin, co-founder of Facebook
 Eduardo Serra, Portuguese cinematographer
 Eduardo Souto de Moura, Portuguese architect
 Eduardo Valente da Fonseca, Portuguese writer
 Eduardo V. Manalo (born 1955), current Executive Minister of the Iglesia ni Cristo

Fictional characters
 Eduardo (Foster's Home for Imaginary Friends), a character in the animated television series Foster's Home for Imaginary Friends
 Eduardo "Lalo" Salamanca, a character in the TV series Better Call Saul
 Eduardo, a character in the comedy animated series Eddsworld
 Eduardo, an older Spix's Macaw who is Jewel's long-lost father in the animated film Rio 2

See also
Duarte (disambiguation)
Edoardo
Eduarda (name)
Edu (disambiguation)

Portuguese masculine given names
Spanish masculine given names